Chung Hee-sung (born 25 November 1976) is a South Korean former professional tennis player.

Chung, a graduate of Samil Technical High School in Suwon, began competing on the professional tour in the mid 1990s and reached a best singles world ranking of 680. He was a quarter-finalist at the ATP Challenger tournament in Seoul in 1995. From 2000 to 2003 he represented South Korea in the Davis Cup, featuring mostly in doubles. He won six ITF Futures doubles titles during his career. In 2018 he took over as captain of the South Korea Davis Cup team.

ITF Futures titles

Doubles: (6)

See also
List of South Korea Davis Cup team representatives

References

External links
 
 
 

1976 births
Living people
South Korean male tennis players
People from Suwon
Sportspeople from Gyeonggi Province
21st-century South Korean people